is a fictional character in the One Piece franchise created by Eiichiro Oda.  The character made her first appearance in the 114th chapter of the series, which was first published in Japan in Shueisha's Weekly Shōnen Jump magazine on November 22, 1999.

In the series, Robin is introduced as an antagonist, but eventually becomes the seventh member of the Straw Hat Pirates crew, captained by Monkey D. Luffy. Acting as the group's archaeologist and historian, Robin is a Devil Fruit user who possess the power of the Flower-Flower Fruit, allowing her to sprout replicas of her limbs, and later her entire body, from any surface. As the only survivor of the island of Ohara, Robin is the only known living person in the world of One Piece with the ability to read the ancient stones called Poneglyphs, something considered threatening by the World Government, which forbids the practice.

Robin has become extremely popular and a breakout character in anime and manga fandom. She has also appeared in several adaptations based on the manga, including the anime television series in which she is voiced by Yuriko Yamaguchi & Anzu Nagai as a child in the original Japanese language, as well as by Veronica Taylor and Stephanie Young & Jad Saxton as a child in the English versions. She has also become a popular subject of cosplay, causing a trend in Japan where women attempted to replicate her iconic costumes.

Concept and creation 
The character of Nico Robin was created by manga artist Eiichiro Oda, the author of the manga series One Piece, and she made her first appearance in its 114th chapter, titled "The Course", which was first published in Shueisha's Weekly Shōnen Jump magazine on November 22, 1999. As a fan of film director Quentin Tarantino, Oda stated that he used as a source of inspiration for Robin's design the character of Mia Wallace, played by Uma Thurman in Pulp Fiction (1994), one of Tarantino's most famous films. According to Oda, Robin is a 30-year-old, has her birthday on February 6, and is 6.2 feet tall which is around 188 cm. When asked by a fan what the nationalities of the members of the Straw Hat Pirates would be if One Piece was set in the real world, Oda replied that Robin would be Russian. Robin was a later addition to the story and Robin and Franky are the only crew members who did not appear in the original concept art for the Straw Hats. However there was a male member who was a botanist, which may allude to Robin’s Devil Fruit power.

Abilities 
Robin ate the Hana Hana no Mi, a Paramecia-type Devil Fruit that allows her to sprout duplicates of any of her body parts from any surface within range. The number of duplicates she can create appears to be unlimited, so long as they are within range. Usually, when she uses her powers, she crosses her arms and makes an "X" shape across her chest, though it's shown that she does not necessarily need to do so to use her abilities. 

She can sprout her duplicate body parts from her own body, inanimate surfaces, and even from other people's bodies. She can even sprout duplicate body parts on top of other duplicate body parts. She maintains full control of her duplicated limbs and can perceive sights and sounds remotely through duplicate eyes and ears. 

Robin can create entire clones of herself and even sprout gigantic-sized limbs.

Appearances

In One Piece 
Being raised in Ohara, home of the world's oldest and largest library, Nico Robin becomes an archaeologist at the age of eight. At some point she gains the power of the Paramecia-type Flower-Flower Fruit, which allows her to have temporary copies of parts of her body, including her eyes and ears, which spring up on surfaces near her. Behind her teachers' backs, she acquires from them the outlawed knowledge of how to translate the ancient stones called Poneglyphs, which are scattered around the world. She comes to share their goal of finding the elusive Real Ponegliff, which is said to tell the world's lost history. However, the World Government finds out about these efforts and sends a battlefleet to stop them. Only Robin escapes the devastating attack that claims the lives of the island's entire population, including that of her mother, Nico Olvia.

Given the epithet "Devil Child" by the World Government, traumatized, and with a bounty on her head, Robin lives a life on the run, unable to trust anyone. To survive, she cooperates with various pirates and other outlaws. She eventually joins Sir Crocodile's Baroque Works group, using the codename Ms. All-Sunday and becoming their vice-president. After Baroque Works falls apart, with nowhere else to go, she tags along with the Straw Hat Pirates and grows so fond of them that she gives herself up to the Government in order to save them. After they discover her real reason for leaving, the Straw Hat Pirates declare open war against the Government to get her back. She realizes that she has finally found people who will never sell her out and becomes part of the crew.

Two years later, Robin further hones her Flower-Flower Fruit powers to the point where she can create a full-bodied duplicate of herself and even wings composed entirely of arms and hands that allow her to fly. After Robin was unsuccessfully captured in Wano by CP0, the Government's direct intelligence agency after another Cipher Pol organization CP9 had already failed to execute her two years prior, her bounty was raised to over seven times her previous bounty, from 130,000,000 to 930,000,000.

In other media 
In the anime television series adaptation of the manga, Robin's voice actress is Yuriko Yamaguchi. In the 4Kids Entertainment English adaptation, her Baroque Works codename was changed to Miss Sunday and she is voiced by Veronica Taylor who portrays her with a country accent. In the Funimation English adaptation, her voice is supplied by Stephanie Young. In addition to the anime, Robin is featured in many of the adaptations based on the One Piece media franchise, including films, video games, and others as well. Emiya Ichikawa II performed as Robin in a kabuki play inspired by One Piece that ran at Tokyo's Shinbashi Enbujō throughout October and November 2015. Robin has also appeared as a playable character in the crossover fighting games Jump Super Stars and Jump Ultimate Stars.

Jamie Lee Curtis said she would like to play Nico Robin in the Netflix adaptation, but noted it was unlikely due to her age.

Reception

Popularity 
Nico Robin is one of the most popular characters in the One Piece series. Ever since her debut, she has become a popular subject of cosplay, causing a trend in which female fan readers of the series attempt to replicate the various iconic looks of the character that have been shown over the years. In 2013, website Tokyo Otaku Mode held a poll asking anime and manga fans via Facebook which characters they would most want to date; Robin was ranked in 2nd place. In 2014, Goo Ranking conducted a poll amongst NTT customers by asking for their favorite female and male black-haired anime characters, with Robin ranking in 6th place out of the top 15 females.

Critical response 
Reviewing One Piece, Rebecca Silverman of Anime News Network (ANN) said that Robin "watches everything with quiet, amused detachment", while also noting how Robin's store of knowledge is "steadily growing and she is starting to really put things together". Reviewing the 278th episode of the anime, Sam Leach of ANN commented that Robin's "big 'I want to live!' scene is one of the most cathartic moments you'll ever find in fiction".

Sean Cubillas of Screen Rant wrote, "Based on aesthetics alone, Nico Robin is an easy fan favorite for her dark, mysterious design and attitude. Her backstory more than skyrocketed her to legendary status, as it brought tears to everyone's eyes and expanded the series' scope and sense of politics. It didn't take long after that for the series to truly immortalize her." In another article, Cubillas stated, "Nico Robin, at first sight, is clearly one of the edgier characters of the group. She has a sharp stare to most and often carries herself with a mysterious demeanor. Her introduction into the series as an elite assassin and vice president to an underground organization likely hasn't helped. Fortunately for her, she's taken to the Straw Hats to lighten her demeanor and, in recent stories, has become more of a mother figure to the crew. However, just because she's nicer, doesn't mean that she doesn't have the same, dark imagination. Whenever something dangerous or mysterious happens to the crew, Nico Robin always comes up with a darker scenario that dials up everyone's tensions further."

Notes

References

External links 

 Nico Robin's bio at One Pieces official website 

One Piece characters
Comics characters introduced in 1999
Female characters in anime and manga
Fictional characters who can duplicate themselves
Fictional archaeologists
Fictional historians
Fictional sole survivors
Fictional sea pirates
Fictional female pirates
Fictional female assassins
Fictional genocide survivors
Fictional orphans
Fictional characters with post-traumatic stress disorder
Orphan characters in anime and manga
Shapeshifter characters in comics